Upper Hutt City Football is an association football club in Upper Hutt, Wellington which plays its home games at Maidstone Park.

Upper Hutt City Football started as Upper Hutt United in 1926 and then alternative clubs were formed in the region through Tararua United in the 1970s and a women's club, Upper Valley Wanderers in the 1980s. In the late 1990s the three clubs agreed to amalgamate as Tararua Sports Club with their clubrooms and home ground based at Harcourt Park. At a meeting in 1998 it was agreed that the football teams would play as Upper Hutt City Soccer before they were renamed Upper Hutt City Football in 2011.

After construction of an artificial surface pitch at Maidstone Park in 2011 it was decided in 2012 to move the clubrooms and home pitch to the park while still retaining Harcourt Park as its alternative home ground.

Teams

Senior men's
 Upper Hutt City 1sts (Capital Premier)
 Upper Hutt City 2nds (Capital 2)
 Upper Hutt City 3rds (Capital 3)
 Upper Hutt City Hooligans (Capital 2)
 Upper Hutt City Creeps (Capital 8)
 Upper Hutt City Marauders (Capital 9)
 Youth U19s and U17s

Upper Hutt City Football also runs an annual Men's U19s Tournament (the Parapine ITM Bob Bamford Memorial Tournament) in preparation for the national champs in Napier.

Masters
 Upper Hutt City Saints (Master 1)
 Upper Hutt City RJs (Masters 2)

Women's
 Girls' U18s

The Women's team highest national honours is the semi-finals of the 2016 Women's Knockout Cup which they lost to Glenfield Rovers 1–0 and the 2017 Women's Knockout Cup which they lost to Eastern Suburbs 5–0.

Women's Premier Team Honours:

 2016 – National Women's Knockout Cup semi-finalist
 2017 – National Women's Knockout Cup semi-finalist
 2017 - Kelly Cup Winners
 2017 - W League Winners

References

External links
 Club Website
 Capital Football Club Profile
 "Ultimate New Zealand Soccer" Website

Association football clubs in Wellington
Association football clubs established in 1926
Sport in Upper Hutt
1926 establishments in New Zealand